Farmersville Station is a hamlet in Cattaraugus County, New York, United States. Farmersville Station has a post office with ZIP code 14060, which opened on October 23, 1878.

References

Hamlets in Cattaraugus County, New York
Hamlets in New York (state)